Anolis tetarii is a species of lizard in the family Dactyloidae. The species is found in Venezuela.

References

Anoles
Reptiles described in 1996
Endemic fauna of Venezuela
Reptiles of Venezuela
Taxa named by Tito Barros
Taxa named by Ernest Edward Williams